Woodberry Kitchen is a New American restaurant in Baltimore's Woodberry neighborhood. In 2015, Woodberry Kitchen's founder, Spike Gjerde, won the James Beard Award for “Best Chef: Mid-Atlantic,” making him Baltimore’s only James Beard Award winner.

Restaurant
In October 2007, Spike and Amy Gjerde opened Woodberry Kitchen in a repurposed 19th century industrial park. The restaurant was designed by Charles Patterson of SM+P Architects. 

On the heels of the 2015 James Beard Award, Tom Sietsema of The Washington Post described Woodberry Kitchen as,  “the perfect Mid-Atlantic restaurant”, adding, “… Gjerde's food reminds me what a great pantry he has in his backyard. I always think of Woodberry Kitchen as the Chez Panisse of our region.”

Sourcing practices

Woodberry Kitchen is often noted for its commitment to sourcing locally. It is estimated that restaurant has returned over $2 million to Mid-Atlantic farmers and winemakers. Chef Bryan Voltaggio describes Gjerde as a figurehead in the effort to revitalize an agricultural region in jeopardy.

David Hagedorn of The Washington Post notes that the menu lists the, "40-plus growers, Maryland and Pennsylvania cheesemakers and local, sustainable fish and shellfish purveyors," whose raw ingredients are utilized each night.

Awards and accolades

The Washington Post awarded Woodberry Kitchen 3 stars in their 2015 Fall Dining Guide.

Woodberry Kitchen was included on Washingtonian Magazine's 100 Very Best Restaurants in 2014, 2015 and 2016.

Baltimore Magazine has included Woodberry Kitchen on their list of Baltimore's 50 Best Restaurants every year since 2010.

Wine Enthusiast Magazine listed Woodberry Kitchen as one of America's Best Wine Restaurants of 2016

In 2013, Spike and Amy Gjerde were recipients of Martha Stewart's "American Made" award honoring "those who inspire us with their beautiful goods, quality craftsmanship, and innovative ideas."

Woodberry Pantry
Every year, Woodberry Kitchen preserves thousands of pounds of produce for use when locally grown options diminish. This comprehensive preservation program allows Chef Gjerde and the Woodberry Kitchen team to source locally year-round. Snake Oil, a hot sauce made with heirloom fish peppers, was originally processed and bottled at Woodberry Kitchen and is currently sold at retailers in Maryland and Washington D.C.

See also
 List of New American restaurants

References

2007 establishments in Maryland
New American restaurants
Restaurants established in 2007
Restaurants in Baltimore